This article contains a list of fossil-bearing stratigraphic units in the state of Minnesota, U.S.

Sites

See also

 Paleontology in Minnesota

References

 

Minnesota
Stratigraphic units
Stratigraphy of Minnesota
Minnesota geography-related lists
United States geology-related lists